Robert Terry McDonell (born August 1, 1944) is an editor, writer and publishing executive. Most recently, he co-founded The Literary Hub. His memoir, The Accidental Life: An Editor's Notes on Writing and Writers was published by Knopf in 2016.

Early life and education 
McDonell was born in Norfolk, Virginia, the son of Irma Sophronia (née Nelson) and Robert Meynard McDonell.

McDonell attended the University of California, Berkeley and graduated from the University of California, Irvine.

Magazine career 
McDonell served as editor of Time Inc. Sports Group from 2006 to 2012.

As Editor of the Time Inc. Sports Group. McDonell directed all editorial content and operations of the weekly magazine Sports Illustrated, SI.com,  GOLF Magazine and GOLF.com,  as well as SI Kids, FanNation.com  and international editions including SI China, SI South Africa, and SI India.

He was hired as SI'''s 8th Managing Editor of Sports Illustrated in February 2002. Under his leadership, SI Digital's net revenues jumped 180% in 2006 and 587% over three years. That digital growth along with newsstand sales and reader satisfaction scores for the weekly were among the reasons McDonell was named one of Sports Business Journal’s 50 Most Influential People in Sports Business in 2007 and a member of Adweek’s Magazine Executive Team of the Year.National Magazine Awards Database Magazine Publishers of America    

In 2009, McDonell created the first magazine for the iPad.

Before moving to SI, McDonell led the conversion of Wenner Media's US Magazine to US Weekly. He came to Wenner Media to edit Men's Journal, and had also worked at Wenner launching Outside Magazine in 1977, and editing Rolling Stone in the early 1980s.  He left Rolling Stone for Newsweek (1983-85), where he was an AME and also created Newsweek Access ("THe Magazine of Life and Technology).". 

McDonell was the founding editor of both Rocky Mountain Magazine (1979) and SMART (1984-90) magazines.

As the editor-in-chief of Esquire (1990-93), McDonell also launched Esquire Sportsman and Esquire Gentleman. After Esquire, he was editor-in-chief and publisher of Sports Afield, which he relaunched as an upscale hunting and fishing magazine.

McDonell's magazines have been nominated for 29 National Magazine Awards and received the award in 2003, 2005 and 2010. 

In 2012, McDonell was inducted into the ASME Magazine Editors' Hall of Fame.

 Writing 
McDonell is also a novelist (California Bloodstock) and a poet (Wyoming: The Lost Poems). His memoir, The Accidental Life: An Editor's Notes on Writing and Writers was published by Knopf in 2016. 

He also wrote the video game Night Trap 

 Television and film 
As a screenwriter he wrote for Miami Vice (episodes "Back in the World" and "Over the Line"); and China Beach (episode "Waiting for Beckett").  

McDonell appeared as himself on Saturday Night Live ("Prose and Cons") in 1981; and hosted the television talk show Last Call'' produced by Brandon Tartikoff and MCA ((19904-95).

Service and awards 
McDonell serves as president of the board of directors of The Paris Review Foundation.

Since 2016 McDonell's papers have been collected at The Briscoe Center for American History at the University of Texas.

Personal life 
McDonell lives in Manhattan with his wife, Stacey Hadash. With his first wife, Joan Raffeld, he is the father of novelist Nick McDonell and actor Thomas McDonell.

References

External links 
 “Sports Illustrated Is Expected to Get an Outsider as Editor,” The New York Times. By David Carr. February 5, 2002.
 “A Mr. Fix-It For Sports Illustrated,” Media Life Magazine. By Carl Bialik. February, 2002.
 “Terry McDonell is Mr. Fix-It, But Can He Fix Wenner’s Folly?” Media Life Magazine. By Maureen Garry. September, 1999.

1944 births
American magazine editors
Living people